Ali Reza Ashrafi  (1964 – 9 January 2023) was an Iranian mathematician who worked in computational group theory and mathematical chemistry. Ashrafi was a professor at the department of pure mathematics of the University of Kashan and the vice president of the International Academy of Mathematical Chemistry.

Death
Ashrafi died in a car accident on the way home in Kashan on 9 January 2023.

See also
Science in Iran
Intellectual movements in Iran

References

1964 births
2023 deaths
21st-century Iranian mathematicians
20th-century Iranian mathematicians
Academic staff of the University of Kashan
Road incident deaths in Iran